Herringbone is a solitaire card game that is played with 104 playing cards. It is also commonly known as Pigtail, Braid or under its original German name "Der Zopf". The game requires relatively little planning but plays well as medium hard solitaire game. The English name was mentioned by Lady Cadogan's Illustrated Games of Solitaire or Patience in 1914.

Rules
Start by building a central herringbone (or braid/pigtail) with 21 cards in the middle of the tableau.  Then allocate six free cells to the left and to the right of the bone, and place the eight foundations (four on each side) farther out to the left and the right.

The goal is to build on the 8 wrap-around foundations to the left and the right of the tableau. Only the lowest card of the herringbone is available for play. One cannot build on the herringbone. Four free cells are linked to the herringbone in the center. You are allowed to fill them with the last card from the herringbone if it does not fit to the foundations. All free cells can be used to hold cards from the waste that may be useful soon.

Variations
In Long Braid, the game starts with 24 instead of 21 cards in the middle, and cards from the braid/herringbone can be played to all free cells, not merely the four linked specifically to the herringbone.

Both "Herringbone" and "Braid" can each refer to two other solitaire games that are played with quite different rules.

References
 Cadogan, Adelaide, 1914. Lady Cadogan's Illustrated Games of Solitaire or Patience, New Revised Edition, including American Games, David McKay Company, Philadelphia, copyright expired.
 Rudolf Heinrich, 1993, “Die schönsten Patiencen”. Perlen-Reihe 641, 27th Edition, probably out of print, Perlen-Reihe Verlag, Wien

See also
 Backbone
 List of solitaires
 Glossary of solitaire

Double-deck patience card games
Simple packers